Events in the year 1815 in Art.

Events
April 22 – English portrait painter Thomas Lawrence is knighted.
Rebuilding of Brighton Pavilion by John Nash begins in England.
The unfinished Waterloo Vase is presented to the Prince Regent of the United Kingdom who commissions the sculptor Richard Westmacott to complete it.
Beginning of Biedermeier period in the European arts.
Académie Suisse, an informal art school, is established in Paris by artists' model Martin Suisse.
James Pollard's first four mail coach paintings are engraved and published as aquatints in England.

Works
John Constable – Boat-building near Flatford Mill
Francisco Goya
The Junta of the Philippines
Self-portrait at 69
Tauromaquia
Orest Kiprensky – Portrait of Vasily Zhukovsky
J. M. W. Turner
Crossing the Brook
Dido Building Carthage, or, The Rise of the Carthaginian Empire

Births
February 15 – Eugène-Louis Lequesne, French sculptor (died 1887)
February 18 – Baron Leys, Belgian painter (died 1869)
February 21 – Jean-Louis-Ernest Meissonier, French Classicist painter and sculptor (died 1891)
March 15 – Dimitrije Avramović, eminent Serbian painter of icons and frescoes (died 1855)
May 19 – Thomas Thornycroft, English sculptor (died 1885)
June 11 – Julia Margaret Cameron, née Pattle, Indian-born British photographer (died 1879)
July 12 – Hablot Knight Browne ("Phiz"), English illustrator (died 1882)
September 1 – Emma Stebbins, American sculptor (died 1882)
November 15 – John Banvard, American panorama painter (died 1891)
December 8 – Adolph Menzel, German painter and engraver (died 1905)
December 21 – Thomas Couture, French painter and art teacher (died 1879)
date unknown
Carlos Luis de Ribera y Fieve, Spanish painter, son of Juan Antonio Ribera (died 1891)
Thomas Stuart Smith, Scottish painter (died 1869)

Deaths
March 7 – Francesco Bartolozzi, Italian engraver (born 1725)
June 1 – James Gillray, British caricaturist (born c.1756)
June 28 – Torii Kiyonaga, Japanese ukiyo-e printmaker and painter of the Torii school (born 1752)
August 31 – John Edwards, English botanist, painter, designer and illustrator (born 1742)
September 9 – John Singleton Copley, American painter (born 1738)
November 9 - Samuel Alken, English sculptor and engraver (born 1756)
November 9 – Giuseppe Bossi, Italian painter, arts administrator and writer on art (born 1777)
December 31 – Thomas Burke, Irish engraver and painter (born 1749)
date unknown
Charlotta Cedercreutz, Swedish painter and noblewoman (born 1736)
Johann Christian Eberlein, German painter (born 1770)
Emma Körner, German painter (born 1788)

 
Years of the 19th century in art
1810s in art